The Tajikistan national handball team is the national handball team of Tajikistan and is controlled by the Tajikistan Handball Association.

The Team is yet to compete in any major tournaments. However the team plays friendly matches mostly against Afghanistan and teams from Central Asia.

Tournament records

Asian Championship
 Yet to participate.

Asian Games
 Yet to participate.

Other Tournaments
2011 Afghanistan International Handball Tournament in Kabul: 3rd place
2012 Challenge Trophy International Handball Tournament in Samarkand: 3rd place
2015 Handball Friendship Cup in Kabul: ?

References

External links
Official Facebook
IHF profile

Handball in Tajikistan
Men's national handball teams
Handball